Sakhuwanankar Katti  is a village development committee in Siraha District in the Sagarmatha Zone of south-eastern Nepal. At the time of the 1991 Nepal census it had a population of 2594 people living in 419 individual households.

References

External links
UN map of the municipalities of  Siraha District

Populated places in Siraha District
Rural municipalities of Nepal established in 2017
Rural municipalities in Madhesh Province